Sunday Lake (in French: lac Sunday) is a lake located in the municipality of Saints-Martyrs-Canadiens, in the Arthabaska Regional County Municipality, in the administrative region du Centre-du-Québec, in Québec, in Canada.

Geography 
Camp Beauséjour is a welcoming place for groups and families. Various activities; recreational trips, family camp, fishing are available.

References 

Lakes of Centre-du-Québec
Arthabaska Regional County Municipality